Raccoon is an unincorporated community in Washington County, Pennsylvania, United States. It is home to the Lyle Covered Bridge.

Unincorporated communities in Washington County, Pennsylvania
Unincorporated communities in Pennsylvania